Gennaro Righelli (12 December 1886 – 6 January 1949) was an Italian film director, screenwriter and actor. He directed more than 110 films in Italy and Germany between 1910 and 1947. In 1930, he directed the first Italian sound film, The Song of Love. He was married to the film star Maria Jacobini, whom he frequently cast in his films.

Selected filmography

Red Love (1921)
 The Voyage (1921)
 La Boheme (1923)
 Orient (1924)
 The Doll Queen (1925)
 Svengali (1927)
 Homesick (1927)
 The Prisoners of Shanghai (1927, writer)
 The Champion of the World (1927)
 Five Anxious Days (1928)
 The President (1928)
 The Secret Courier (1928)
 Orient (1928)
 Their Son (1929)
 The Night of Terror (1929)
 The Song of Love (1930)
 The Blue Fleet (1932)
 Together in the Dark (1933)
 Stadium (1934)
 The Last of the Bergeracs (1934)
 Mr. Desire (1934)
 Those Two (1935)
 The Amnesiac (1936)
 White Amazons (1936)
 Abandon All Hope (1937)
 They've Kidnapped a Man (1938)
 La voce senza volto (1939)
 The Knight of San Marco (1939)
 The Courier of the King (1947)

References

External links

1886 births
1949 deaths
Italian film directors
20th-century Italian screenwriters
Italian male screenwriters
Italian male film actors
Italian male silent film actors
German-language film directors
20th-century Italian male actors
20th-century Italian male writers
People of Emilian descent